A Dream of the Past: Sir Isumbras at the Ford (1857) is a painting by John Everett Millais depicting a medieval knight helping two young peasant children over a swollen river. The children are carrying heavy burdens of wood for winter fuel. Though the title refers to the medieval poem Sir Isumbras, the painting does not illustrate a scene from the original text. However Millais's friend, the writer Tom Taylor, wrote verse in a pastiche of the original poem, describing the event depicted. This was included in the original exhibition catalogue.

The background of the painting is based closely on a ruined medieval bridge which stood in Bridge of Earn, Perthshire (since demolished).  Some of the village houses (in Back Street) can also be seen, though the tower house or castle to the left is imaginary.

When first exhibited the painting was extremely controversial, and was attacked by many critics. Millais's former supporter John Ruskin declared it to be a "catastrophe". The painting was also satirised in a print by Frederic Sandys, entitled "A Nightmare", in which Millais himself was represented as the knight. His fellow Pre-Raphaelites Dante Gabriel Rossetti and William Holman Hunt were caricatured as the children, and the horse—transformed into a donkey—was branded with the initials of Ruskin.

Subject
The original poem describes an arrogant knight who is humbled by misfortune in his youth, a story derived from the Book of Job and the legend of Saint Eustace. The subject depicted by Millais portrays the elderly, now humble, Isumbras after the events narrated in the poem. It was described by Frederic George Stephens as follows,

'Sir Isumbras at the Ford' was the subject of the picture Millais made his leading work in the year 1857. It represented an ancient knight, all clad in golden armour, who had gone through the glories of this life – war honour, victory and reward, wealth and pride. Though he is aged and worn with war, his eye is still bright with the glory of human life, and yet he has stooped his magnificent pride so far as to help, true knight as he was, two little children, and carries them over a river ford upon the saddle of his grand war-horse, woodcutter's children as they were. The face of this warrior was one of those pictorial victories which can derive their success from nothing less than inspiration. The sun was setting beyond the forest that gathered about the river's margin, and, in its glorious decadence, symbolised the nearly spent life of the warrior.

The theme of the Christian Chivalry was a topical one at the time, discussed by Ruskin himself and other authors such as Charles Kingsley, who saw it as a means to overcome class division. It is comparable to the hymn Good King Wenceslas, written in the same decade, which also describes an aristocrat helping peasants who have been gathering fuel. Millais was also probably influenced by Albrecht Dürer's print, The Knight, Death and the Devil.

Controversy
 Critical commentary on the painting when it was first exhibited was largely hostile, with many critics finding the horse over-large and ugly and the expressions of the children exaggerated. Ruskin (whose wife Effie had left him for Millais a few years previously) was extremely savage, condemning the picture for making errors in "pictorial grammar" by portraying the foreground as lighter than the "more exposed" hills in the background. He insisted that Millais had suffered "not just a fall—but catastrophe".

In response, Millais attempted to repaint parts of the picture before he sent it to another exhibition in Liverpool. The repainted version won a prize at the Liverpool exhibition. Millais altered the picture again in the 1880s, adding decoration to the reins and bridle.

Influence
Despite its early bad reception, the painting became quite influential, inspiring a number of other images of chivalric knights. It was also taken up by political caricaturists, who took their cue from Sandys's caricature to replace the figures with politicians of the day, suggesting alliances between mismatched forces in attempts to "carry over" some piece of legislation. This tradition continued well into the 20th century.<ref>Codell, Julie F.  Sir Isumbras, M.P.: Millais's Painting And Political Cartoons, Journal of Popular Culture, 22:3, Winter 1988</ref>

Notes

External links
Lot Notes for A Dream of the Past: Sir Isumbras at the Ford'', 1856, oil on panel

Paintings by John Everett Millais
1857 paintings
Collections of the Lady Lever Art Gallery
Horses in art
Paintings of children
Water in art